{| class="infobox" style="font-size: 90%;"
|+ 2010 All-Ireland Minor Camogie Championship! style="background: #BFD7FF; text-align: center" colspan="3" | Championship Details
|-
|Dates|colspan="2"|
|-
|Competitors|colspan="2"|
|-
|Sponsor|colspan="2"|
|-
! style="background: #BFD7FF; text-align: center" colspan="3" |All-Ireland Minor Camogie Championship winners
|-
|Winners|colspan="2"| Galway (1st title)
|-
|Captain|colspan="2"| Laura Donnellan
|-
|Manager|colspan="2"| Johnny Kane
|-
! style="background: #BFD7FF; text-align: center" colspan="3" | All-Ireland Minor Camogie Championship Runners-up
|-
|Runners-up|colspan="2"| Clare
|-
|Captain|colspan="2"| 
|-
|Manager|colspan="2"| Chloe Morey
|-
|Matches played|colspan="2"| 
|}
The 2010 All-Ireland Minor Camogie Championship''' is an inter-county competition for age graded development squad county teams in the women's team field sport of camogie.  The championship was won by Galway, who defeated Clare by four points in a replayed final. The drawn match was played at Nenagh and the replay at Semple Stadium.

Arrangements
Three goals and two points from Susan Fahy helped Clare beat Tipperary in the semi-final at Kilmallock. Galway defeated Kilkenny 1–14 to 2–10 as Kilkenny only managed 1–3 from play.

The Final
Rebecca Hennelly took a pass from Shauna Healy and drove it to the Clare net, and then Rebecca Hennelly added a point from a free for Galway’s equalizer in a drawn final at Nenagh.   Ailish O'Reilly’s first-half goal helped Galway to a 2 - 12 to 2 - 8 victory over Clare in the replay at Semple Stadium. Clodagh McGrath and the accurate Rebecca Hennelly gave Galway the perfect start, and after O'Reilly’s goal, three unanswered points from Hennelly (free), Aoife Donoghue, and Finola Keely put gave Galway the initiative. Despite a Clare fight-back, Marie Breheny sealed the game for Galway with her 39th-minute goal.

B Division
Goals from Mary Jo McCullagh, Mary Kelly and Gráinne McNicholl secured the Minor B final for  Derry who defeated Antrim by ten points in the final at Celtic Park. Derry defeated Offaly 5–17 to 0–5 and Antrim defeated Waterford 2–14 to 2–6 both at Ashbourne in the semi-finals. The Minor C final was won by Carlow who defeated Armagh by ten points in the final. Two goals by Eleanor Treacy gave Carlow  a half time lead as an exciting second-half saw 28 scores by 15 different players.

Final stages

Final stages

References

External links
 Camogie Association

Minor
All-Ireland Minor Camogie Championship